Iram Javed (born 16 December 1991) is a Pakistani cricketer who currently plays for Pakistan as a right-handed batter and occasional right-arm medium-fast bowler. She has also played domestic cricket for Lahore, Punjab, Higher Education Commission, Omar Associates and State Bank of Pakistan.

In January 2020, she was named in Pakistan's squad for the 2020 ICC Women's T20 World Cup in Australia. In October 2021, she was named in Pakistan's team for the 2021 Women's Cricket World Cup Qualifier tournament in Zimbabwe. In January 2022, she was named as a reserve in Pakistan's team for the 2022 Women's Cricket World Cup in New Zealand. In May 2022, she was named in Pakistan's team for the cricket tournament at the 2022 Commonwealth Games in Birmingham, England.

References

External links
 
 

1991 births
Living people
Cricketers from Lahore
Pakistani women cricketers
Pakistan women One Day International cricketers
Pakistan women Twenty20 International cricketers
Lahore women cricketers
Punjab (Pakistan) women cricketers
Higher Education Commission women cricketers
Omar Associates women cricketers
State Bank of Pakistan women cricketers
Cricketers at the 2022 Commonwealth Games
Commonwealth Games competitors for Pakistan